Merle Alcock (February 6, 1884 - March 1, 1975) was an American contralto who sang with the Metropolitan Opera in 236 performances from 1919 to 1929, officially signing in with them in 1924.

Alcock's concert debut was in London in 1914. She also sang with the Boston and New York Symphony Orchestras. She found a patron in Mrs. Charles Schwab in 1916. Mrs. Schwab was herself a singer as a young woman. Alcock first sang at the Met in a performance of Verdi’s Requiem Mass on Dec. 14, 1919. Her opera debut was on Nov. 15, 1923, when she sang the role of the fiddler Beppe in L’amico Fritz. Alcock trained other singers in her retirement such as Eileen Farrell.

Alcock was born Merle Tillotson in Andover, Missouri, to Zula and the Reverend Elijah Tillotson. She graduated from Drake University’s Conservatory of Music in 1906. She married Bechtel Alcock, a tenor, in 1914. The two would often perform together. She died on March 1, 1975, and is buried in Wooster Cemetery in Wooster, Ohio.

References

External links

MetOpera database
Merle Alcock in Discography of American Historical Recordings

1884 births
1975 deaths
American people of Irish descent
American operatic contraltos
20th-century American women opera singers
Singers from Iowa